Schoen is a common surname of German origin. People with the surname include:

Alan Schoen (b. 1924), US physicist
Christian Schoen (b. 1970), German art historian
Craig Schoen (b. 1983), US athlete in basketball
Cristie Schoen (1976-2015), Spanish-born US chef
Dan Schoen (b. 1974), US political figure
David Schoen (b. 1958), US lawyer based in Alabama
Douglas Schoen (b. 1953), US political commentator
Edgar Schoen (b. ca. 1925), US physician
Gaili Schoen (b. ca. 1970), US musician
Gerry Schoen (b. 1947), US athlete in baseball
Harold Schoen (b.ca. 1941), US educator
Herbert Schoen (1929-2014), German athlete in football
John W. Schoen (b. 1952), US journalist
Karl John Schoen (1894-1918), US aviator, war hero
Lawrence M. Schoen (b. 1959), US author, psychologist
Max Schoen (1888-1959), US music educator
Richard Schoen (b. 1950), US mathematician
Seth Schoen (b. 1979), US computer authority
Thomas Schoen, Abbot of Bornem Abbey.
Tom Schoen (b. 1946), US athlete in football
Vic Schoen (1916-2000), US musician
Wilhelm von Schoen (1851-1933), German diplomat

See also
Schön (surname)

Surnames from nicknames